Kot Cho Wai (born 16 December 1991 in Hong Kong) is a former Hong Kong professional footballer who currently plays as an amateur player for Hong Kong First Division League club North District. He plays as a centre midfielder or a right midfielder.

Club career

South China
In July 2011, Kot was promoted from the reserve to the first team. He will wear number 20 in the 2011–12 season.

In August 2011, he was being loaned to a newly formed club Hong Kong Sapling.

Hong Kong Sapling
Kot made his senior career debut on 11 September 2011 in the away match against Tai Po, which Hong Kong Sapling lost 0–3. He was a used substitute for the first 4 league games, and his performance impressed head coach Paul Foster. He was one of the usual starting XI for Hong Kong Sapling, although he was usually being substituted in the second half of the matches. On 16 February 2012, he received his first red card in Hong Kong First Division League in a match against South China. He made 16 league appearances in total.

Sun Hei
Kot joins Sun Hei in the 2012–13 season for an undisclosed fee.

Career statistics

Club
As of 23 February 2013

References

1991 births
Living people
Association football midfielders
Hong Kong footballers
Hong Kong First Division League players
South China AA players
Sun Hei SC players